List of Commonwealth Boxing Council female champions is a table showing the Commonwealth female champions certificated by the Commonwealth Boxing Council (CBC). CBC is also affiliated with the WBC.

v — Champion vacated title.
r — Champion retired title.
s — Champion stripped of title.
(n) — where 'n' is the number of occasions the title has been won.

Featherweight

Bantamweight

Lightweight

Super lightweight

Super welterweight

See also

Commonwealth Boxing Council
List of Commonwealth Boxing Council champions

References

External links
Commonwealth Boxing Council official website

Lists of boxing champions
Lists of women boxers